Gladys Tamez is a Mexican-American haute couture milliner, or hat designer. She is considered a preeminent milliner, and arguably the most famous in America. Based in Los Angeles, she founded her eponymously named Gladys Tamez Millinery in 2012.

Early life 
Tamez attended art school in Florence, Italy where her initial designs were created. While travelling in Vitoria-Gasteiz, Spain, Tamez discovered a small hat shop run by four generations of milliners that inspired her to focus on hat design.

Career 
Tamez is best known for her work with Lady Gaga, for whom she designed a hat worth one million dollars and the famous Joanne pink hat. Tamez is also associated with celebrities including Megan Thee Stallion, Cardi B, Beyoncé, Johnny Depp, David Bowie, Kim Kardashian, Alicia Keys, Cher, Katy Perry, Janet Jackson, Salma Hayek, Jennifer Lopez, Cindy Crawford, Travis Barker, Demi Lovato, Future, Lil Nas X, Ariana Grande, Sia, Kendall Jenner, Kylie Jenner, Kourtney Kardashian, Hailey Bieber, Nathalie Kelley, LeBron James, Vanessa Hudgens, Kelly Wearstler, and Gigi Hadid. She is also a member of the Council of Fashion Designers of America. Tamez was listed by Forbes as one of the most creative Mexicans in the world.

References 

Milliners
Mexican fashion designers
Mexican women fashion designers
Year of birth missing (living people)
Living people
American fashion designers
American women fashion designers